Guillermo Zavala (born 28 January 1958) is a Mexican former freestyle and medley swimmer. He competed at the 1976 Summer Olympics and the 1980 Summer Olympics.

References

External links
 

1958 births
Living people
Mexican male freestyle swimmers
Mexican male medley swimmers
Olympic swimmers of Mexico
Swimmers at the 1976 Summer Olympics
Swimmers at the 1980 Summer Olympics
Place of birth missing (living people)